State Route 170 (SR 170) is a state highway in northeastern Clark County, Nevada. Also known as Riverside Road, the route serves the Riverside townsite, the town of Bunkerville and the city of Mesquite. The highway was previously a part of former U.S. Route 91 (US 91).

Route description

From there, the two-lane highway meanders southeasterly approximately  before reaching the Riverside townsite and the Virgin River. The route crosses the river, then turns northeasterly to somewhat parallel the south side of the river. The highway travels about  before reaching the town of Bunkerville. After another , the highway turns due north, crosses the Virgin River again, and enters the city of Mesquite. The highway travels about  northward through the southern portion of the city before ending at an intersection with Mesquite Boulevard (former SR 144).

History
A gravel road approximating the alignment of present-day SR 170 appeared on official state maps by 1933. This road was marked as part of State Route 6 and U.S. Route 91—these designations traversed the southern portion of the state from the California state line to the Arizona state line at Mesquite via Las Vegas. The road in this area was fully paved by 1934. By 1955, a shorter, multi-lane highway had been constructed to bypass Bunkerville to the northwest. US 91 (and SR 6) were relocated from Riverside Road to the new alignment, which would later become I-15.

In 1976, the Nevada Department of Transportation began an effort to renumber its state highways. In this process, Riverside Road would again be designated a state highway, State Route 170. This designation was applied on July 1, 1976, and was first seen on state highway maps in 1978. The route has remained relatively unchanged since.

Major intersections

See also

References

External links

Historic Photos of State Route 170

170
U.S. Route 91
Transportation in Clark County, Nevada